Tashkent City Women Professional Cycling Team is an Uzbekistan women's road bicycle racing team, established in 2022, which participates in elite women's races.

Team roster

Major results
Source:
2022
 Grand Prix Mediterrennean WE, Yanina Kuskova
  National Road Race Championships, Shaknoza Abdullaeva
  National Time trial Championships, Margarita Misyurina

National Champions
2022
  Uzbekistan Road race, Shaknoza Abdullaeva
  Uzbekistan Time trial, Margarita Misyurina

References

External links

UCI Women's Teams
Cycling teams based in Uzbekistan
Cycling teams established in 2022